Ellen Gunilla Hillingsø (born 9 March 1967) is a Danish actress who is known primarily for her work in films. She is also a voice actress, narrating audio books.

Early life
Ellen Gunilla Hillingsø was born on 9 March 1967 in Copenhagen to Kjeld Georg Hilligsøe Hillingsø, then a lieutenant in the Danish Royal Life Guards, and Ellen Birgitta Hillingsø (née Juel), an antiques dealer. Hillingsø's maternal grandfather was Gregers Juel, a chamberlain and a Knight (1st Class) of the Order of the Dannebrog. Her paternal uncle was Lars Hillingsø, a fashion designer and founder of the Lars Paris brand.

Hillingsø has one sibling, Jens Georg, who is three years older. Jens works at the Rigshospitalet in Copenhagen and is a former chairman of Médecins sans Frontières.

Career
Primarily a film actress, Hillingsø made her debut in the farce Huller i suppen in 1988, playing a small role alongside the comic duo John and Aage (Povl Erik Carstensen and Morten Lorentzen). After appearing in En verden til forskel (1989), she began as a stage actress, appearing at the Århus Theatre from 1990 to 1994.

In 1996, Hillingsø appeared in Peter Thorsboe's drama Krystalbarnet, in which she starred with Mirosław Baka, Grażyna Barszczewska, and Helene Egelund. In 1999, she starred in Søren Kragh-Jacobsen's Mifune's Last Song alongside Iben Hjejle, Anders Hove, Sofie Gråbøl, and Paprika Steen. In 2007, she appeared in Karlas kabale, based on the 2003 book of the same title written by Renée Simonsen. Also in 2007 she starred in the Danish television police drama Anna Pihl.

In 2010 she starred in the film Eksperimentet, directed by Louise Friedberg. The film deals with social experiments and the problem of cultural genocide in Greenland. The film premiered on 28 August 2010 in the Katuaq Culture Centre in Nuuk, the capital of Greenland.

Aside from her work as an actress, Hillingsø has done notable work as a voice actress in cartoons, film and TV, and in audio books.

Personal life
Hillingsø married the director of Saxo Bank, Christoffer Castenskiold, on 27 December 2000. They have two children together.

Filmography

Film 
Huller i suppen (1988)
En verden til forskel (1989)
 Krystalbarnet (1996)
 Sekten (1997)
 Mifunes sidste sang (1999)
 Klinkevals (1999)
 Når lysterne tændes (2001)
 Jolly Roger (2001)
 En kort en lang (2001)
 Olsen-banden Junior (2001)
 Drengen der ville gøre det umulige
 Floden (2002 - stemme)
 Silkevejen (2004)
 Opbrud (2005)
 Afrejsen (2005)
 Allegro (2005)
 Den Rette Ånd (2005)
 Sprængfarlig bombe (2006)
 Anja og Viktor - brændende kærlighed (2007)
 Karlas kabale (2007)
 En forelskelse (2008)
 Maj & Charlie (2008)
 Karla og Katrine (2009)
 Over gaden under vandet (2009)
 Karla og Jonas (2010)
Eksperimentet (2010)

TV 
 Charlot og Charlotte (1996)
 Hvor svært kan det være (2002)
 Absalons hemmelighed (2006)
 Anna Pihl (2007)
 Album (2008)
 Livvagterne (2009)
 The Bridge (2011–2018)
  Rita (2012–2020)
 Hjørdis (2015)

References

External links

Danish film actresses
Danish voice actresses
Audiobook narrators
1967 births
Living people
Actresses from Copenhagen